Aeromonas rivipollensis is a Gram-negative, facultatively anaerobic, rod-shaped and motile bacterium from the genus Aeromonas which has been isolated from river sediments from the Ter River in Spain.

References

 

Aeromonadales
Bacteria described in 2016